Robert of Scotland may refer to:
 Robert de Brus, 5th Lord of Annandale, claimant to the Scottish throne 1290–92, sometime regent of Scotland
 Robert I of Scotland
 Robert II of Scotland
 Robert III of Scotland
 Robert, 1st Duke of Albany, Regent of Scotland